Calm.com, Inc., doing business as Calm, is a software company based in San Francisco, California. It produces meditation products, including guided meditations and Sleep Stories on its subscription-based app.

History 
Calm was founded on May 4, 2012 by Michael Acton Smith and Alex Tew. Tamara Levitt became the Head of Mindfulness in November 2014 and is one of the app's primary narrators.

The company generated $22 million in revenue in 2017 and reached an annual revenue run rate of $75 million. , Calm had raised $1.5M in angel investments.

As of February 2019, the company was valued at $1 billion and had raised $116 million, with contributions from existing investors, including Insight Venture Partners, Ashton Kutcher's Sound Ventures, and Creative Artists Agency.

Calm was Apple's "App of the Year" in 2017, and was ranked by Inc. as one of the fastest-growing private companies in America in 2018.

In February 2022, Calm acquired Ripple Health Group, a technology company that connects users with proper healthcare options. The acquisition will focus on building Calm Health, which will replace the company's existing employer offering, Calm for Business.

Calm Health was released in October 2022 and offered through traditional healthcare providers, payers, and self-insured employers. It will initially be offered to patients suffering from anxiety or depression. The company plans to add mental health programs for those with other physical conditions.

In November 2022, Calm had four million paid subscribers.

Product 
Calm produces meditation products, including guided meditations, a book, narrated Sleep Stories, and health and meditation videos. Their primary product is the meditation app, available on iPhone and Android devices.

The app features both meditation tools and sleep aids.

The meditation area offers breathing exercises, a daily meditation, several multi-day programs, and unguided and guided meditation sessions.

On December 1, 2016, Calm launched an initial range of 23 Sleep Stories, with the aim of helping adult listeners sleep.

Sleep Stories include archival recordings of Bob Ross, classical and ambient music including compositions by Johannes Brahms, Sigur Rós, deadmau5, and Moby, as well as original stories and public domain fiction read by narrators including LeBron James, Stephen Fry, Lucy Liu, Idris Elba, Kate Winslet, Beatie Wolfe, Danai Gurira, Joanna Lumley, Jerome Flynn, Terry W. Virts, Rosè, Keith Morrison, Tom Hiddleston, Clarke Peters, Richard Hamilton, Cillian Murphy, Kelly Rowland, ASMR content creator Emma "WhispersRed" Smith, League of Legends voice actor Erik Braa, Peter Jefferson, Freema Agyeman, Eva Green, LeVar Burton, Laura Dern, Nick Offerman, Harry Styles and Matthew McConaughey. Leona Lewis contributed narration to the sleep stories in 2018, supporting (RED)'s Global Fund to end AIDS.

The company also produced a nature documentary series for HBO Max.

The app also hosts Alanis Morissette's 2022 ambient album The Storm Before the Calm.

Jay Shetty, the company's chief purpose officer, hosts a short mindfulness message called "The Daily Jay."

Publications 
 Calm: Calm the Mind. Change the World (Penguin, 2015), Michael Acton Smith,

See also 
Baa Baa Land

References 

Companies based in San Francisco
American companies established in 2012
Meditation
Mindfulness
Software companies established in 2012
Software companies of the United States
2012 establishments in California
Information technology companies of the United States
Software companies based in California
Technology companies based in California
Technology companies of the United States